2008 presidential election may refer to:
 2008 Armenian presidential election
 2008 Azerbaijani presidential election
 2008 People's Republic of China presidential election
 2008 Cypriot presidential election
 2008 Czech presidential election
 2008 Dominican Republic presidential election
 2008 French Polynesian presidential election
 2008 Ghanaian presidential election
 2008 Kosovan presidential election
 2008 Lebanese presidential election
 2008 Maldivian presidential election
 2008 Marshall Islands presidential election
 2008 Mauritian presidential election
 2008 Montenegrin presidential election
 2008 Nepalese presidential election
 2008 Pakistani presidential election
 2008 Palauan presidential election
 2008 Russian presidential election
 2008 Serbian presidential election
 2008 Taiwan presidential election
 2008 Trinidad and Tobago presidential election
 2008 United States presidential election
 2008 Zimbabwean presidential election

See also
 Electoral calendar 2008
 :Category:2008 elections